Third is the last play written by Tony Award and Pulitzer Prize-winning playwright Wendy Wasserstein, which premiered Off-Broadway in 2005. The play involves a female professor and her interactions with a student.

Production history
Third premiered at Washington D.C.'s Theater J, in January–February 2004 as a one-act play, directed by Michael Barakiva, and featuring Kathryn Grody and Eddie Boroevich.

The Lincoln Center for the Performing Arts production opened Off-Broadway at the Mitzi Newhouse Theater, in previews on September 29, 2005 and closing on December 18, 2005. It was directed by Daniel J. Sullivan, a frequent artistic collaborator with Wasserstein. The cast of Third included Dianne Wiest as Laurie Jameson and Charles Durning. Jason Ritter, actor-son of John Ritter, played the part of Woodson Bull, III, the student accused of plagiarism.  Ritter won the Clarence Derwent Award and the Martin E. Segal Award for his performance of the title character. The sets were designed by Thomas Lynch, costumes by Jennifer von Mayrhauser, and lighting by Pat Collins. Original music was by Robert Waldman and the sound design was by Scott Stauffer.

Plot
The play takes place at a small New England college during one academic year. It focuses on the life of a female college professor at a prestigious liberal arts college, Laurie Jameson, and how her life and fundamental assumptions are challenged by an encounter with a student, Woodson Bull, III. The professor and student have strongly divergent personal and political characteristics. Because of these differences, the professor accuses the student of plagiarism when he turns in an assignment that seems, to her, to be beyond his ability to produce. The play grapples with the issues of stereotyping and identity politics, as well as generational and family issues.

Critical response
The berkshirefinearts.com reviewer wrote: "Easily, it is among her wittiest, wisest, and perhaps most personal play...Set at an unnamed, elite, New England liberal arts college, this play's central character, Professor Laurie Jameson, could be considered one in the line of Wasserstein's "uncommon women" of middle age. Perhaps she is smugly more certain of her ideas than many of the playwright's other previous major female characters."

Ben Brantley, in his review in The New York Times, wrote "Like Heidi, Laurie is a strong and vulnerable, independent and emotionally needy woman. She is, in other words, a feminine feminist of the stripe that has endeared Ms. Wasserstein to many theatergoers over the years... It's the certainty of uncertainty in life that makes "Third," ... so affecting despite itself. Using the hot button of academic plagiarism to trigger the plot, "Third" suffers from problems common to Ms. Wasserstein's plays: an overly schematic structure, a sometimes artificial-feeling topicality... Yet "Third" exhales a gentle breath of autumn, a rueful awareness of death and of seasons past, that makes it impossible to dismiss."

Awards and nominations
Lucille Lortel Award
Outstanding Lead Actress (nominee)
Outstanding Featured Actor (Charles Durning) (win)
Artois Award
Off-Broadway Theatre Casting, Daniel Swee (win).

References

External links 
Internet Off-Broadway Database listing
 Lincoln Center Announcement for Third. Accessed October 14, 2007
TheaterMania review, Third/Welcome to My Rash, Jan. 2004

2005 plays
Plays by Wendy Wasserstein
One-act plays